Boram redirects to Jeon Boram. 

It also refers to  

Boram block - a community development block in Jharkhand, India
Boram, Purvi Singhbhum - a village in Jharkhand, India